Lucy Pevensie is a fictional character in C. S. Lewis's The Chronicles of Narnia series. She is the youngest of the four Pevensie children, and the first to find the Wardrobe entrance to Narnia in The Lion, the Witch and the Wardrobe. Of all the Pevensie children, Lucy is the closest to Aslan. Also, of all the humans who have visited Narnia, Lucy is perhaps the one that believes in Narnia the most. She is ultimately crowned Queen Lucy the Valiant, co-ruler of Narnia along with her two brothers and her sister. Lucy is the central character of the four siblings in the novels. Lucy is a principal character in three of the seven books (The Lion, the Witch and the Wardrobe, Prince Caspian, and The Voyage of the Dawn Treader), and a minor character in two others (The Horse and His Boy and The Last Battle).

Lucy is portrayed by Georgie Henley in the 2005 film The Chronicles of Narnia: The Lion, the Witch and the Wardrobe and she returned to reprise her role in the 2008 film The Chronicles of Narnia: Prince Caspian. Georgie's elder sister, Rachael Henley, portrays the older Queen Lucy at the end of the first film. Georgie Henley also reprised her role in the 2010 film The Chronicles of Narnia: The Voyage of the Dawn Treader, which is the third of the film series.

The character of Lucy Pevensie was inspired by June Flewett, a devout Catholic London girl evacuated by her convent to The Kilns, Lewis' country home in 1942, and named after Lewis' goddaughter Lucy Barfield, to whom he dedicated The Lion, The Witch and the Wardrobe. Lucy is described in the book as being fair-haired: "But as for Lucy, she was always gay and golden-haired, and all princes in those parts desired her to be their Queen, and her people called her Queen Lucy the Valiant."

Lucy was the most faithful of the four and the closest to Aslan, and never stopped believing in Narnia. She and her brothers Peter and Edmund, after dying in a train crash in England, were transported to Aslan's Country with the other Narnians.

Character
Lucy is the most sensitive and faithful out of all her siblings; which is why she is written as seeing Aslan across the gorge in Prince Caspian and her brothers and sister written as cynical and less inclined to go on blind faith. As a young child in The Lion, the Witch and the Wardrobe in a strange house without her mother about, she is also extremely vulnerable and is looking for security, wonder and something to believe in. She is teased mercilessly by Edmund about Narnia, being accused of playing "childish games". Once she knows he also has visited the land in the wardrobe and he still maintains that they were only playing a game, her anguish knows no bounds, as her faith in humanity and the security of her own beliefs about her siblings are now also under threat.

Lucy loves animals, and befriends many creatures, and is devastated in Prince Caspian to discover that not only has Narnia been invaded by the Telmarines; but that they have suppressed the many creatures and divine and semi-divine beings that made Narnia the extraordinary place it was. Her heartfelt night-time roam through the woods, craving to see the tree spirits dance and share in their communion with nature and life once again is one of the very deep moments of love, hope and disappointment that we share with Lucy in her spiritual journey. Lucy also never stops believing in Narnia and is full of courage because of her faith; and is thus more adventurous than her sister Susan. Lucy has a great desire to help others, which is symbolized by the healing cordial that was given to her by Father Christmas for others in need and only with sparing use. The lesson from Aslan on the battlefield in The Lion, the Witch and the Wardrobe is to use this power impartially and not dwell on the needs of those she loves most.

The Lion, the Witch and the Wardrobe
Lucy's siblings, Peter, Susan and Edmund, do not believe her about Narnia at first, but later they all find their way to Narnia.

Lucy is the first of the Pevensies to enter Narnia through a magical wardrobe in the Professor's old house, into Narnia in the One Hundred Year Winter, under the rule of the White Witch, the evil self-proclaimed Queen of Narnia. There she meets Mr. Tumnus the Faun and, then later, the Beavers. However, her brother Edmund had also slipped into Narnia on the second occasion Lucy had entered, and encountered the White Witch while she was visiting Mr. Tumnus. Edmund, who had already jeered at Lucy about her "magical" country, continued to be spiteful towards Lucy by denying that either of them had been in Narnia. When the children all enter Narnia, Edmund slips away from the house of the Beavers and defects to the White Witch.

While travelling with Peter, Susan and Mr. and Mrs. Beaver to the Stone Table, they meet Father Christmas, who gives them gifts. Lucy is given a vial with magical cordial that can heal almost any injury, and a small dagger with which to defend herself "a great need". Edmund, meanwhile, had tried to betray the Beavers and joined the White Witch; he had first met her and been seduced by promises of power after first entering the wardrobe when trying to follow Lucy on her second entry to Narnia.

She and her companions arrive at Aslan's camp, and later that night, she and Susan comfort Aslan as he walks to his death – although they do not know of his fate at the time. Both girls also witness his sacrifice. While their brothers are going to war, Lucy and her sister see Aslan come back to life and help him wake the creatures in the White Witch's castle, which the White Witch had turned to stone. They meet with their brothers at the end of the battle.

At Cair Paravel, she is crowned as Her Majesty Queen Lucy by Aslan to the throne as co-ruler of Narnia, this marking the fulfilling of the ancient prophecy and the end of the White Witch's reign. During her reign, she is named Queen Lucy the Valiant. She and her siblings make a Golden Age in Narnia.

Years later, while hunting the White Stag through Lantern Waste, she and her siblings notice the lantern where she met Mr. Tumnus. The Pevensies return through the wardrobe into England, where no time has passed and they are children again.

The Horse and His Boy
The events in The Horse and His Boy take place after the siblings are crowned, and before they return to England, in The Lion, the Witch and the Wardrobe, and Queen Lucy is a young woman who rides to the aid of Archenland. She is described by Prince Corin as being more like a tomboy, unlike her sister, Queen Susan, who is a "proper lady". She helps King Lune to welcome Aravis to Anvard and helps to get Aravis's room and clothes ready.

Prince Caspian
Lucy (who is now 9) travels to Narnia again with her three siblings. Lucy is the only one to see Aslan at first, and she has a terrible time convincing her brothers and sister as well as Trumpkin the dwarf that he had returned, echoing her trials early in the first book. However, Edmund believes her and backs her up. Aslan tells her to try again and says that she must follow him alone if they refuse to come with her. Lucy comments that Aslan has grown larger, but really she is the one who has grown.

The Voyage of the Dawn Treader
While Susan travels with Mr. and Mrs. Pevensie to America and Peter studies with Professor Digory Kirke, Lucy (age 11), Edmund and their cousin Eustace are drawn into Narnia through a magical painting in  The Voyage of the Dawn Treader. This is very much Lucy's book, written largely from her point of view. However, in the end, Aslan firmly tells her and Edmund that they have become, like Susan and Peter, too old to further experience the wonders of Narnia.

The Last Battle
In The Last Battle, she plays a minor part as she returns to Narnia again with her brothers, High King Peter and King Edmund, along with Eustace Scrubb, Jill Pole, Polly Plummer, and Digory Kirke. There, she witnesses the destruction of Narnia and lives in the new Narnia created by Aslan. In the new Narnia, all the people and animals who lived in the previous Narnia during its existence return and join together. Lucy also meets her old friend Mr. Tumnus the Faun again, and Aslan tells her about a railway accident that occurs in England in which she, her brothers, her parents, Polly, Digory, Eustace and Jill die. She and Digory, Polly, Peter, Edmund, Eustace and Jill stay in Aslan's homeland for eternity, however, Susan remains living on Earth, her final fate undetermined.

Portrayals
In the 1967 TV serial, she was portrayed by Liz Crowther.
 In the 1980s BBC serial, Lucy is portrayed by English actress Sophie Wilcox.
 In Walden Media's The Chronicles of Narnia films, Lucy is portrayed by English actress Georgie Henley as a child and Rachael Henley (her older sister) as an adult.

Other appearances
Although reviews of The Oz/Wonderland Chronicles issue 0 indicated that Alice, Wendy Darling and Dorothy Gale shared their dorm with Susan Pevensie, a recent review of the now-released issue 1 indicates many fans are believing this is actually meant to be Lucy and not Susan.

She is spoofed in the 2007 film Epic Movie, played by Jayma Mays.

References

External links
 The Voyage of the Dawn Treader at Narnia Fans
 NarniaWeb

The Chronicles of Narnia characters
Child characters in film
Child characters in literature
Female characters in literature
Female characters in film
Literary characters introduced in 1950
Fictional English people
Fictional queens
Fictional women soldiers and warriors
Kings and Queens of Narnia